Jacinta Yangapi Nampijinpa Price (born 12 May 1981) is an Australian politician from the Northern Territory. She has been a senator for the Northern Territory since the 2022 federal election. She is a member of the Country Liberal Party, a politically conservative party operating in the Northern Territory affiliated with the national Coalition. She is also a singer/songwriter and has worked in children's television.  She is of Aboriginal Australian heritage.

She served as a councillor for Alice Springs between 2015 and August 2021, serving as deputy mayor in her last year as councillor. During this time, in 2019 she stood unsuccessfully for the Division of Lingiari at the 2019 federal election.

Price's activism and views focus primarily on issues faced by Aboriginal communities, and she is a vocal advocate for conservative Aboriginal politics in Australia. She has highlighted the high rates of domestic and other violence in Aboriginal communities, and advocates for a "law and order" approach. She is critical of "welfare dependency" and "opportunistic collectivism". She opposes the proposed Indigenous Voice to Parliament, and thinks that calls to  change Australia Day and the Australian Flag are counter-productive to Aboriginal advancement.

She is the daughter of Warlpiri community leader and former politician Bess Price.

Early life
Price was born on 12 May 1981 in Darwin, Northern Territory, and grew up in Alice Springs. Her father, David Price, is of Anglo-Celtic descent and was born in Newcastle, New South Wales. Her mother, Bess Price, who served in the Northern Territory Legislative Assembly, is a Warlpiri woman. Bess Price is a fellow member of the CLP, who served as a minister in the Adam Giles NT Government, holding portfolios including housing and statehood, and was a vocal supporter of the Howard Government's 2007 Northern Territory Intervention, that implemented new legislation in response to the crises facing Aboriginal communities. 

Price has written that her mother was "born under a tree and lived within an original Warlpiri structured environment through a kinship system on Aboriginal land. Her first language was Warlpiri, and her parents, my grandparents, only came into contact with white settlers in their early adolescence in the 1940s."

TV and musical career

Jacinta Price has performed as a singer/songwriter. As a youngster, she learned the violin before joining local hip hop groups Flava 4 and C-Mobs. In 2001, she was chosen to sing the national anthem for the Yeperenye Federation Festival. In 2013, she released her first music album Dry River, a mix of folk, soul and country music, paying tribute to her life growing up in Central Australia. Triple J likened her sound to that of Tracy Chapman.

Price also had a TV career in the children's television program, Yamba's Playtime, where she played the best friend of the lead character Yamba the Honeyant.

Entry into politics

Alice Springs Council

Price was elected as a councillor on the Alice Springs Town Council in 2015. At her swearing in to the Alice Springs council in 2015, Price's mother Bess Price officiated, as NT Minister for Local Government. She served until August 2021, when she did not stand for re-election. She was also the Deputy Mayor of Alice Springs in her last year as councillor.

Price shared a close relationship with fellow councillor Jamie di Brenni, and agreed with him on most issues. She said in a 2017 interview that her values aligned with generally "with the old white fellas" on the council; however, she was against fracking as there is a potential risk to water sources from this practice. Price said that council had not done enough to combat the disproportionate amount of violence against women seen in Alice Springs, and she would like to see more campaigning on the issue. She had called a forum with women, including town camp residents, to discuss community needs and antisocial behaviour. She had also worked with the council's Youth Action Group, and had championed recreational and creative opportunities for youth in the town.

2019 federal election candidate
Price stood unsuccessfully, as the Country Liberal Party candidate,  for the Division of Lingiari at the 2019 federal election. She secured 44.54 percent of the two-party preferred vote against long-serving Labor incumbent Warren Snowdon, to his 55.46 percent.

In January of that year, Greens Lingiari candidate George Hanna had shared a racist meme attacking Price, referring to her as a "coconut" (an ethnic slur). Price described the post as despicable, and called for the Greens to disendorse Hanna, but the Greens refused. Aboriginal activist Steve Hodder Watt accused Price of hypocrisy, and published messages in which Price referred to him as "white".  

Price was also criticised over a video of an Al Jazeera video which she had posted to her Facebook page in 2005, and which had featured a critique of violence in Islam by writer-psychiatrist Wafa Sultan, a Syrian-American ex-Muslim. The Australian National Imams Council called the video Islamophobic. In response, a CLP spokesperson told the ABC News that her motivation for sharing the video was part of her long campaign against the use of religion or culture to justify violence against women.

Senator for the Northern Territory
Price became a Senator for the Northern Territory at the 2022 federal election, replacing Sam McMahon, whom she defeated for preselection in June 2021. She was pre-selected in the Country Liberal Party's number one Senate ticket position for the election, and successfully won the second of two seats alongside Labor's Malarndirri McCarthy. As a senator elected from a territory, Price's term commenced immediately, as opposed to senators elected from the states, whose terms are fixed to start from 1 July.

In federal parliament, Price sits in the National Party room.

Maiden speech 

Price delivered her first speech in the Senate on 27 July 2022. Prior to making the address, she took part in a traditional ceremony with her grandmother handing her a nulla-nulla hunting stick sourced from her Country. "The ceremony was telling the story about Jukurrpa, which is Dreaming relating to our family", Price said. "Passing on through this nulla-nulla the authority to me to speak on behalf of our area." Wearing traditional headdress for her maiden speech, she then outlined her priorities for office, citing housing, women's safety and economic development as key concerns. The Age reported that Price made an "impassioned plea against 'false narratives' of racism and [called] the push for an Indigenous Voice to Parliament a symbolic gesture that could divide black and white Australia". Price called for a restoration of law and order in remote communities to combat the scourge of violence:

Price invoked the legacy of the first Aboriginal Senator Neville Bonner to criticise "welfare dependency" and "opportunistic collectivism" as barriers to Aboriginal advancement:

Indigenous leader and politician Warren Mundine called the address the "greatest speech" he'd heard in parliament. Journalist Greg Sheridan called it "magnificent... a kind of Australian Gettysburg Address that should be read by all Australians". The Age newspaper called the speech a "red flag for Albanese" on the Indigenous Voice issue.

Indigenous welfare policies 

Price has been a vocal supporter of alcohol restrictions in remote Aboriginal communities and the cashless debit card, and criticised the Labor government for overturning these welfare policies. In her maiden speech, she said the overturning of grog bans would allow alcoholism and accompanying violence to flourish, while the cashless welfare card had improved the lives of many families on welfare, who could "feed their children rather than seeing their money claimed by kinship demand from alcoholics, substance abusers and gamblers".

On 4 August 2022 she called for urgent action on the alcohol crisis in remote communities.

Voice to Parliament 

Price has opposed the Albanese Government's proposal for a referendum to enshrine a Indigenous Voice to Parliament within the Australian Constitution on the grounds that it would be a racially divisive bureaucracy that couldn't be dismantled, that it would set indigenous and non-indigenous people on an unequal footing, and would imply that Aboriginal people are a "separate entity to the rest of Australia". Noting her objections to the Voice, Aboriginal journalist Stan Grant told the ABC Insiders program on 31 July 2022 that Price will be "a significant and important voice on [the isssue] and clearly others in the Coalition Opposition have gathered around her..."

In her maiden speech, Price told Parliament that the Labor government was "yet to demonstrate how this proposed Voice will deliver practical outcomes and unite rather than drive a wedge further between Indigenous and non-Indigenous Australia". In a 2022 book entitled Beyond Belief... Rethinking the Voice to Parliament, Price wrote: "The globally unprecedented Voice proposal will divide Australia along racial lines... It will constitutionally enshrine the idea that Aboriginal people are perpetual victims – forever in need of special measures."

In November 2022, Price fronted cameras alongside Nationals leader David Littleproud to support the Party's formal announcement of opposition to the Voice, telling reporters" "What we need now is practical measures and we have to stop dividing our nation along the lines of race."

Political positions and activism
Price's activism primarily focuses on issues faced by Aboriginal communities.

Aboriginal autonomy 
Price generally takes a conservative view towards issues facing Aboriginal communities. Price has criticised what she terms "paternalistic" approaches to Aboriginal autonomy. She advocates for law and order, racial equality before the law, and an end to what she calls "welfare dependency" and "opportunistic collectivism" in Indigenous policy.

Price criticised former Australian Labor Party leader Bill Shorten for paternalism during his visit to Barunga in 2018.

Crime in Aboriginal communities 
Price has highlighted the high rates of domestic and other violence in Aboriginal communities.  She advocates for law and order, and racial equality before the law. She rejects the "white privilege" narrative, and has criticised left-wing public discourse around Indigenous deaths due to violence and, in particular Aboriginal deaths in custody. In her maiden speech, Price rejected the idea of racism causing Aboriginal deaths in custody as a "false narrative", and told Parliament: "We cannot support legislation that prioritises freedom of the perpetrator over justice for the victim, in an attempt to reduce rates of incarceration."

Price rejects claims of systemic racism in the Australian prison system against Aboriginal people, citing the finding of the Royal Commission into Aboriginal Deaths in Custody (1987–1991) that there was no evidence that proportionately more Aboriginal Australians die in custody than non-Indigenous Australians. In her maiden speech, Price said "Our greatest problem lies with the fact that in the [30 years after the Royal Commission], over 750 Indigenous Australians were murdered at the hands of other Indigenous Australians — yet there is little concern or acknowledgment that this is why Indigenous Australians are incarcerated at such high rates."

Following a June 2020 Black Lives Matter protest in Melbourne, Price accused protesters of being ignorant and uncaring, stating: "70 per cent of Aboriginal men and women incarcerated are incarcerated for acts of violence against their loved ones. [The Left] don't care because the perpetrators are also black, people only care if there is seen to be a white perpetrator. It's not racism that is killing our people, it is the actions of our own people". She argued that Black Lives Matter activists have been "ignoring the real crisis" facing Indigenous people.

Australia Day debate 

Price thinks that calls to  change Australia Day and the Australian Flag are counter-productive to Aboriginal advancement.

In 2018, Price supported the "Save Australia Day" campaign promoted by Mark Latham. In 2021, she criticised the push to change the date of Australia Day, saying that changing the date would not improve the lives of Aboriginal people. Price described Australia Day as a "magical day" and rejected claims that the day commemorates the subjugation of Aboriginal people.

Other roles 
Price's folk/soul/country album, Dry River, was launched in 2013.

Outside of elected office, Price served as Indigenous program director for the Centre for Independent Studies, a libertarian think tank based in Sydney. Her January 2021 paper, Worlds Apart: Remote Indigenous disadvantage in the context of wider Australia, surveyed the statistics on third-world conditions and extreme levels of violence in remote communities.

Price is a regular guest on Sky News Australia.

Awards and recognition

Price was presented with the inaugural Freedom and Hope Award at the Australian Conservative Political Action Conference (CPAC) held in Sydney in October 2022. Crikey described her as "the breakout star' of the event.

Legal proceedings 
Price launched defamation proceedings against the Australian Broadcasting Corporation in 2019 in response to its coverage of her "Mind the Gap" tour. She received a full public apology for "false and defamatory" material in April 2021. 

In 2020, Price was sued for defamation by Nova Peris, former  federal government senator for the NT, who is also Aboriginal. Price had accused Peris of protecting sexual predators while on the television program Studio 10. According to transcripts provided by the Supreme Court of Victoria, Price stated that Peris had been involved with "powerful men who have made it to powerful positions who have never been condemned". Price later apologised to Peris for these remarks.

In August 2022 journalist Peter FitzSimons threatened to sue Price for defamation when she complained that he had been rude and aggressive in a telephone interview. Price urged FitzSimons and his newspaper, The Sydney Morning Herald, to release the recording of the interview but they declined to do so.

Personal life
Price has three sons from a first marriage. She experienced domestic violence in a later relationship, and is now partnered with Colin Lillie, a cook and musician born in Scotland.

References

External links
 Jacinta Nampijinpa Price at Centre for Independent Studies

1981 births
Living people
Australian indigenous rights activists
Women human rights activists
Indigenous Australian politicians
People from Alice Springs
21st-century Australian politicians
21st-century Australian women politicians
Warlpiri people
Country Liberal Party members of the Parliament of Australia
Members of the Australian Senate
Members of the Australian Senate for the Northern Territory
Women members of the Australian Senate
National Party of Australia members of the Parliament of Australia
People from Darwin, Northern Territory